Cherkasovo is a rural locality (a selo) in Krasnoselskoye Rural Settlement, Yuryev-Polsky District, Vladimir Oblast, Russia. The population was 29 as of 2010.

Geography
Ryabinino is the nearest rural locality.

References

rural localities in Yuryev-Polsky District